Mażucie  is a village in the administrative district of Gmina Gołdap, within Gołdap County, Warmian-Masurian Voivodeship, in north-eastern Poland, close to the border with the Kaliningrad Oblast of Russia.

History
In 1856, the village had a population of 81. In 1938, during a massive campaign of renaming of placenames, the Nazi government of Germany renamed the village to Oberhofen in attempt to erase traces of non-German origin. After Germany's defeat in World War II, in 1945, it became again part of Poland.

References

Villages in Gołdap County